Geben (from ) is a town in Andırın district of Kahramanmaraş Province, Turkey. Near the settlement of Geben is a large baronial castle primarily of Armenian construction (late 11th to 13th c.) with probable late antique/Byzantine remains and a period of Crusader occupation. The two baileys are well-protected with rounded towers. This site was the guardian of the strategic road at the Meryemçil Pass, connecting Cappadocia to the Armenian Kingdom of Cilicia. The remains of a late antique/medieval settlement are in the valley below to the southeast. An extensive photographic survey, description and plan of Geben Castle / Kahramanmaraş was made between 1973 and 1979. 
This road now used only by Geben residents was an important caravan route in history which connected East Mediterranean cities to Central Anatolia.  The population of Geben is 2,127 as of 2010.

References

Populated places in Kahramanmaraş Province
Towns in Turkey
Andırın District